Olowo Rerengejen was the traditional ruler of Owo Kingdom, Ondo state, southwestern Nigeria. He was the King that married Queen Oronsen, the goddess that brought about Igogo festival.

References

Yoruba monarchs
Nigerian traditional rulers
People from Owo
15th-century monarchs in Africa
15th-century Nigerian people